Britannia Hospital is a 1982 British black comedy film, directed by Lindsay Anderson, which targets the National Health Service and contemporary British society. It was entered into the 1982 Cannes Film Festival and Fantasporto.

Britannia Hospital is the final part of Anderson's trilogy of films, written by David Sherwin, that follow the adventures of Mick Travis (portrayed by Malcolm McDowell) as he travels through a strange and sometimes surreal Britain. From his days at boarding school in if.... (1968) to his journey from coffee salesman to film star in O Lucky Man! (1973), Travis's adventures finally come to an end in Britannia Hospital, which sees him as a muckraking reporter investigating the bizarre activities of Professor Millar, played by Graham Crowden, whom he had had a run-in with in O Lucky Man. All three films have characters in common. Some of the characters from if.... that did not turn up in O Lucky Man! return for Britannia Hospital. The film also features Leonard Rossiter, Joan Plowright, Jill Bennett, Marsha Hunt, Fulton Mackay, Vivian Pickles, Richard Griffiths, Arthur Lowe, and Mark Hamill.

Plot
A new wing at Britannia Hospital is to be opened, and the Queen, (presumably Queen Elizabeth, but only ever referred to as H.R.H.) is due to arrive. The administrator of the hospital, Potter (Leonard Rossiter), is confronted with demonstrators protesting against an African dictator who is a VIP patient, striking ancillary workers (opposed to the exotic gastronomic demands of the hospital's private patients) and a less-than-cooperative Professor Millar (Graham Crowden), the head of the new wing. Rather than cancel the royal visit, Potter decides to go out and reason with the protestors. He strikes a deal with the protest leader—the private patients of Britannia Hospital are to be ejected and, in return, the protestors allow a number of ambulances into the hospital. However, unbeknown to the protestors, these ambulances actually contain the Queen Mother and her entourage.

Mick Travis (Malcolm McDowell) is a reporter who is shooting a clandestine documentary about the hospital and its dubious practices. He manages to get inside with the help of a sympathetic nurse (Marsha Hunt) and starts to investigate Millar's sinister scientific experimentation, including the murder of a patient, Macready (Alan Bates). As mayhem ensues outside, Travis is also murdered and his head used as part of a grim Frankenstein-like experiment which goes hideously wrong.

Eventually, the protestors break into the hospital and attempt to disrupt Millar's presentation of his Genesis Project, in which he claims he has perfected mankind. In front of the assembled audience of Royalty and commoners, Genesis is revealed—a brain wired to machinery. Genesis is given a chance to speak and, in a robotic voice, utters the "What a piece of work is a man" speech from Hamlet, until it continuously repeats the line "How like a God".

Cast

The Administration
 Leonard Rossiter as Vincent Potter
 Brian Pettifer as Biles
 John Moffatt as Greville Figg
 Fulton Mackay as Chief Superintendent Johns
 Vivian Pickles as Matron
 Barbara Hicks as Miss Tinker
Medicos
 Graham Crowden as Professor Millar
 Jill Bennett as Dr. MacMillan
 Peter Jeffrey as Sir Geoffrey
 Marsha Hunt as Nurse Persil
 Mary MacLeod as Casualty Sister
The Unions
 Joan Plowright as Phyllis Grimshaw
 Robin Askwith as Ben Keating
 Dave Atkins as Sharkey
The Media
 Malcolm McDowell as Mick Travis
 Mark Hamill as Red
 Frank Grimes as Sammy / Voice of "Genesis"
The Palace
Gladys Crosbie as Queen Elizabeth the Queen Mother
And
 Richard Griffiths as Cheerful Bernie
 Arthur Lowe as hospital patient
 Alan Bates as Macready
 Dandy Nichols as Florrie
 Betty Marsden as Hermione
 Liz Smith as Maisie
 T. P. McKenna as Theatre Surgeon
 Michael Medwin as Theatre Surgeon
 Roland Culver as General Wetherby
 Valentine Dyall as Mr Rochester
 Tony Haygarth as Fraser
 John Gordon Sinclair as Gregory
 Brian Glover as Painter
 Mike Grady as Painter
 Kevin Lloyd as Picket
 Robert Pugh as Picket

Robbie Coltrane, Patsy Byrne and Edward Hibbert had bit parts. This was the final film appearance of Arthur Lowe who died shortly after his scenes were filmed.

Production

Development
Lindsay Anderson says the film had its origins in 1975 with a newspaper story about the "siege of Charing Cross Hospital, when there was a big demonstration against fee-paying private patients led by a union official known as Granny Brookstern. This immediately struck me as absurd. If you stand outside a hospital and stop ambulances going in in the name of humanity you are involved in a wonderfully absurd paradox. The story got even more wild with accusations that Granny Brookstern and the Labour Minister of Health had themselves been private patients; and so I started building up a private scrapbook of newsworthy absurdities."

Anderson said he was inspired by Amiel's theory that the only true principle of humanity is justice. "The man who would today say that liberty and equality are bad principles is a brave man but perhaps a necessary one since, unless they include justice, they are pernicious and self-destructive. That is at the heart of 'Britannia Hospital', though I hope it's not a preachy film but a parable. A parable is a heavenly story with a earthly meaning. I hope this is an earthly story with a heavenly meaning."

Anderson did an outline and sent it to Lew Grade who was not interested. 20th Century Fox under Sandy Lieberson signed Anderson to a two-picture deal, of which one was to be Britannia Hospital. (The other was to be Dress Grey written by Gore Vidal). Anderson arranged for David Sherwin to write a script.

Sherwin said the film was not "about a hospital about all. It's about everything. It's not even a film that's just about Britain."

Lieberson left Fox and the studio dropped the project. Mamoun Hassan of the National Film Finance Corporation said he thought they were "too shocked by it".

Then producer Clive Parsons championed the project. He raised $1 million from Britain's National Film Finance Corporation and $3 million from EMI. Hassan says that there was discussion at the NFFC whether they should support a film by Anderson, who had made a number of movies, but ultimately decided he was an "outsider". Hassan attributes the fact that the budget was raised to Parsons's persistence, and the fact the script had been around a number of years so some of the shock had "worn off". Nonetheless, he called it "a risk... a very black comedy."

Shooting
Filming started August 1981.

It was filmed at Shepperton Studios, using Friern Hospital in Barnet as the exterior of the hospital in October 1981. Filming took 12 weeks.

McDowell said he did the film just for his expenses, and no fee, because there was not enough money in the budget to pay his normal fee and he wanted to work with Anderson again. Mark Hamill also did the part free plus expenses when original choice Treat Williams bowed out.

During filming, Anderson needed another $1 million and two extra weeks to finish the film.

Anderson said:The film ends with a question mark, not a solution, and people don't like that. They want to be let off the hook, and this film impales the audience on rather a large hook. I think that if we are going to find solutions, we're not going to get any help from God, or any pre-sold political notions. The big question remains whether we are good enough or intelligent enough to survive.

Release
It was released in the United Kingdom on 27 May 1982.

Home media
Britannia Hospital was released in the United Kingdom on Blu-ray Disc for the first time on 29 June 2020 under Powerhouse Films. Special features include an audio interview with Anderson, separate new interviews with actors Pettifer and Askwith, interview with film editor Michael Ellis and theatrical trailers.

Critical reception
Most British critics lambasted the film on release, although Dilys Powell reviewed it positively, David Robinson listed it among his top ten for the year, and Geoff Daniel chose it as his film of the year. Critic Ian Haydn Smith considers Britannia Hospital the "nadir" of Anderson's career. "Replacing satire with broad comedy, the film fails on every level in its attempt to critique the state of the National Health Service". The film won the "Audience Jury Award" at Fantasporto.

References

Sherwin, David. Going Mad in Hollywood. London: Andre Deutsh Ltd. 1996

External links

 
 
 
 BFI Screenonline article
 Production notes & photos

1982 films
1980s black comedy films
1982 comedy-drama films
British black comedy films
British comedy-drama films
British satirical films
British sequel films
1980s English-language films
Films about artificial intelligence
Films directed by Lindsay Anderson
Films set in London
Films set in hospitals
EMI Films films
1982 comedy films
1980s British films